Taran Bajaj is an Indian casting director, actor and film producer who has worked as an associate casting director in films like Bhaag Milkha Bhaag, Fukrey. Jazbaa, Thuppakki, Mausam (2011 film) etc. Bajaj first film as individual casting director was Wedding Pullav.

Taran first time came to Mumbai in 2006 and to act in the play Bharat Ke Shahedo Tumhe Naman that was put up by actor Jaya Bachchan’s organisation Yuvak Biradri. Taran played the roles of Bhagat Singh, Kartar Singh and Udham Singh in the play. Taran shifted to Mumbai in 2009 and started his career as associate  Casting Director and later on he started his acting career with Love Sex Aur Dhokha in 2010. Taran acted in films like Junooniyat, Udta Punjab, Jazbaa, John Day (film), Zanjeer (2013 film), Love Shagun

Taran have also worked as casting director more than 100 Advertisement.

Filmography

As actor

Casting director

Casting Department

Producer

References

External links
 
 

Film directors from Punjab, India
Male actors from Uttar Pradesh
Indian male stage actors